Erinus is a genus of flowering plants in the family Plantaginaceae (previously in the family Scrophulariaceae), native to stony mountainous sites in North Africa and southern Europe. Some members of the genus have been cultivated  as ornamental plants, particularly Erinus alpinus, for which a number of different cultivars are available.

Species
Erinus alpinus
Erinus thiabaudii

References

Further reading

External links
Erinus. GRIN.

Plantaginaceae
Plantaginaceae genera